The Nikon Coolpix P520 is a DSLR-styled digital ultrazoom bridge camera announced by Nikon on January 29, 2013.

References
http://www.dpreview.com/products/nikon/compacts/nikon_cpp520/specifications

P520
Cameras introduced in 2013
Superzoom cameras